MITX may refer to:
Mini-ITX, a low-power motherboard form factor developed by VIA Technologies
Massachusetts Innovation & Technology Exchange, a nonprofit industry organization focused based in New England
MITx, a massive open online course program by Massachusetts Institute of Technology